Texas Tower 2 (ADC ID: TT-2) was a former United States Air Force Texas Tower General Surveillance Radar station, first operational in 1955. The tower was closed in 1963 and dismantled.

Located on Georges Bank, Texas Tower 2 was one in a series of manned radar stations that were so named because they resembled the oil-drilling platforms of the Gulf of Mexico. Air Defense Command (ADC) estimated that the Texas Towers would help extend contiguous East Coast radar coverage some  seaward. In terms of Soviet military capabilities, this would provide the United States with an extra 30 minutes of warning time in the event of an incoming bomber attack.

History
Texas Tower 2 began construction in 1955 at Fore River Shipyard in Quincy, Massachusetts. In June 1955, it was successfully floated and towed to its site east of Cape Cod. Beginning in December 1955 enough of the structure was complete that one AN/FPS-3 search radar and two AN/FPS-6 height finder radars  developed by Air Force Rome Air Development Center [RADC] New York, were installed.

Personnel from the 762d Aircraft Control and Warning Squadron, stationed at North Truro Air Force Station, MA performed the operational use of the tower. It was manned by a crew of 6 officers and 48 airmen. The 4604th Support Squadron (Texas Towers) at Otis AFB (now Otis Air National Guard Base) provided logistical support. Life aboard Texas Tower 2 was difficult. Both the structure and its crew suffered from the near-constant vibration caused by rotating radar antennas and diesel generators. The surrounding ocean and tower footings also transmitted distant sounds along the steel legs, amplifying them throughout the entire structure.

With the advent of Soviet ICBMs and the bomber threat was reduced in importance, the tower was decommissioned in 1963 and demolished shortly thereafter.

During the demolition, the remains of the tower sank to the sea floor. It remains there and has become a site for scuba diving.

Units and assignments 
Units:
 762d Aircraft Control and Warning Squadron (Flight), (Operations unit based at North Truro AFS, MA), May 1956-15 January 1963
 4604th Support Squadron (Texas Towers) (Logistics support unit based at Otis AFB, MA), May 1956-15 January 1963
Assignments:
 4704th Defense Wing, May 1956
 4622d Air Defense Wing, 18 October 1956
 Boston Air Defense Sector, 8 January 1957 – 15 January 1963

See also
 List of USAF Aerospace Defense Command General Surveillance Radar Stations

References

 Winkler, David F. (1997), Searching the skies: the legacy of the United States Cold War defense radar program. Prepared for United States Air Force Headquarters Air Combat Command.
  A Handbook of Aerospace Defense Organization 1946 - 1980,  by Lloyd H. Cornett and Mildred W. Johnson, Office of History, Aerospace Defense Center, Peterson Air Force Base, Colorado
 Information for Texas Tower No.2 (Georges Shoal)
 The Texas Towers

External links
Gallery of the construction of the tower

Radar stations of the United States Air Force
Military installations closed in 1963
Aerospace Defense Command military installations
Installations of the United States Air Force in Massachusetts
Military installations established in 1958
1958 establishments in Massachusetts
1963 disestablishments in Massachusetts
Buildings and structures demolished in 1963